La Voz Kids (Spanish for The Voice Kids) is a Spanish reality talent show broadcast on Antena 3. It premiered on 6 February 2014 on Telecinco and is part of the international syndication The Voice based on the original Dutch television program The Voice of Holland, created by Dutch television producer John de Mol.

For the show's first season on Telecinco, David Bisbal, Malú and Rosario Flores were appointed as coaches, being Jesús Vázquez the presenter of the galas with the collaboration of Tania Llasera in backstage.

In May 2018, the series was acquired by Atresmedia. David Bisbal came back as a regular coach, Rosario Flores and Melendi returned as a coaches and fourth coach Vanesa Martín joined the panel. They all returned for the following season. For the seventh season, it was announced that only Bisbal would be returning as a coach, allowing newcomers Aitana, Sebastián Yatra, and Pablo López to join the panel. For the upcoming eighth season, Bisbal, Aitana, and Yatra will return as coaches. After a one season hiatus, Rosario Flores will re-join the panel, replacing Pablo López.

Participation is only for contestants aged 7 to 15.

Format 
First Phase: The Blind Auditions.
In this phase, the three coaches will have their backs to the participants and will be guided solely by their voice. There are 93 young people, however, only 45 will get on stage. If the contestant's voice wins over a member of the jury, he will press a button that will turn his chair to see the participant. In this way, you will demonstrate that you want this contestant to be part of your team. If more than one coach presses the button, the participant will have the option to decide which of the three wants to be trained in this competition; but if a single trainer presses the button, the contestant goes to his team automatically. In case no one of the jury presses the button, it means that the participant has not been selected.

Second Phase: The Battles.
In this stage, the coaches will be forced to reduce their equipment to a third. They must face three of their members who must sing in a "ring". Those who confront each other must demonstrate who has the best voice. In the end, each coach will make the decision to eliminate two of them, who will have to leave the competition. So that the coaches can make a decision, they are advised by other singers. Then they will choose two and the other three will sing the song they sang in the blind auditions, so that they choose one of those three and will join the other two for the live ones. In season 5, the steal from the adults' version of the show was implemented. Each coach has the opportunity to steal one young artist from other teams. In season 7, steals were raised to two per coach.

Third Phase: The Last Assault (Sing Off).
Each contestant must defend their subject of blind auditions before the members of the jury and their advisors. Of each team will be only two contestants who will go to the grand final.

Fourth and final Phase: The Grand Final.
This last phase of the program includes two parts: The semifinal and the final. The finalists will sing songs individually, as well as with their respective coaches, in addition to performances with guest artists. After the first elimination, only 3 contestants will fight to be finally: La Voz Kids (Spain).

Coaches' timeline

Key 
 Featured as a full-time coach
 Featured as a part-time advisor

Notes

Coaches' advisors

Series overview 
Warning: the following table presents a significant amount of different colors.

Seasons summaries

Coaches and finalists 
 – Winning coach/contestant. Winners are in bold, eliminated contestants in small font.
 – Runner-up coach/contestant. Final contestant first listed.
 – Third place coach/contestant. Final contestant first listed.
 – Fourth place coach/contestant. Final contestant first listed.

Season 1

Season 2

Season 3

Season 4

Season 5

Season 6

Season 7

References

Spain
2014 Spanish television series debuts
Spanish reality television series
Telecinco original programming
Antena 3 (Spanish TV channel) original programming
Television series about children
Television series about teenagers